Ilshat Galimzyanovich Fayzulin (born 5 March 1973) is a Russian football coach and a former player of Tatar ethnic origin.

A forward, his career was majorly spent in equal periods of time in Russia and Spain.

Club career
Born in Osinniki, Soviet Union, Fayzulin started playing professionally with PFC CSKA Moscow, where his performances garnered the attention of Spain's Racing de Santander (later, during one season, he would team up with compatriot Dmitri Popov at the La Liga side). Subsequently, he was a relatively important offensive element at Villarreal CF, helping the club achieve a first-ever top flight promotion in 1998.

After two unassuming spells in Portugal, Fayzulin finished 1999–2000 in Turkey with Altay SK, then returned to Spain and its second division with Getafe CF, not being able to prevent the Madrid team's eventual relegation.

Fayzulin then returned to his country, playing with four modest sides, and retired in Spain in 2007 after three years in the lower leagues.

International career
Fayzulin played one game for Russia, featuring 26 minutes in a 1–3 friendly loss against France on 28 July 1993.

Managerial career
On 11 August 2018, Fayzulin was appointed caretaker manager of Banants. On 24 November 2019, Fayzulin resigned as manager of Urartu.

Honours

Club
Soviet League: 1991

Individual
Top 33 players year-end list: 1992, 1993

References

External links
RussiaTeam biography and profile 

1973 births
Living people
People from Kemerovo Oblast
Tatar people of Russia
Tatar sportspeople
Soviet footballers
Soviet Union under-21 international footballers
Russian footballers
Russia under-21 international footballers
Russia international footballers
Association football forwards
Soviet Top League players
Russian Premier League players
PFC CSKA Moscow players
FC Dynamo Saint Petersburg players
FC Metallurg Lipetsk players
La Liga players
Segunda División players
Tercera División players
Racing de Santander players
Villarreal CF players
Getafe CF footballers
Gimnástica de Torrelavega footballers
Primeira Liga players
F.C. Alverca players
S.C. Farense players
Süper Lig players
Altay S.K. footballers
Russian expatriate footballers
Expatriate footballers in Spain
Expatriate footballers in Portugal
Expatriate footballers in Turkey
Russian expatriate sportspeople in Spain
Russian expatriate sportspeople in Portugal
Sportspeople from Kemerovo Oblast